Marcin Rekowski (born 10 January 1978) is a Polish professional boxer.

Professional boxing record 

| style="text-align:center;" colspan="8"|18 Wins (15 knockouts, 2 decisions),  5 Losses, 0 Draws
|-  style="text-align:center; background:#e3e3e3;"
|  style="border-style:none none solid solid; "|Res.
|  style="border-style:none none solid solid; "|Record
|  style="border-style:none none solid solid; "|Opponent
|  style="border-style:none none solid solid; "|Type
|  style="border-style:none none solid solid; "|Round
|  style="border-style:none none solid solid; "|Date
|  style="border-style:none none solid solid; "|Location
|  style="border-style:none none solid solid; "|Notes
|-align=center
|Win
|align=center|18-5
|align=left| Patryk Kowoll
|||
|
|align=left|
|align=left|
|-align=center
|Loss
|align=center|17-5
|align=left| Carlos Takam
|||
|
|align=left|
|align=left|
|-align=center
|Loss
|align=center|17-4
|align=left| Krzysztof Zimnoch
|
|
|
|align=left| 
|align=left|
|-align=center
|Loss
|align=center|17-3
|align=left| Andrzej Wawrzyk
|
|
|
|align=left| 
|align=left|
|-align=center
|Win
|align=center|17-2
|align=left| Bartosz Szwarczynski
|
|
|
|align=left|
|align=left|
|-align=center
|Loss
|align=center|16-2||align=left| Nagy Aguilera
|
|
|
|align=left|
|align=left|
|-align=center
|Win
|align=center|16–1||align=left| Gbenga Oloukun
|
|
|
|align=left|
|align=left|
|-align=center
|Win
|align=center|15–1||align=left| Albert Sosnowski
|
|
|
|align=left|
|align=left|
|-align=center
|- align=center
|Win
|align=center|14–1||align=left| Oliver McCall
|
|
|
|align=left|
|align=left|
|-align=center
|- align=center
|Win
|align=center|13–1||align=left| Mateusz Malujda
|
|
|
|align=left|
|align=left|
|- align=center
|- align=center
|Loss
|align=center|12–1||align=left| Oliver McCall
|
|
|
|align=left|
|align=left|
|- align=center
|- align=center
|Win
|align=center|12–0||align=left| Serdar Uysal
|
|
|
|align=left|
|align=left|
|- align=center
|Win
|align=center|11–0||align=left| Marcin Czech
|
|
|
|align=left|
|align=left|
|- align=center
|Win
|align=center|10–0||align=left| Danny Williams
|
|
|
|align=left|
|align=left|
|- align=center
|Win
|align=center|9–0||align=left| Elijah McCall
|
|
|
|align=left|
|align=left|
|- align=center
|Win
|align=center|8–0||align=left| Bartosz Szwaryzyński
|
|
|
|align=left|
|align=left|
|- align=center
|Win
|align=center|7–0||align=left| Patryk Kowoll
|
|
|
|align=left|
|align=left|
|- align=center
|Win
|align=center|6–0||align=left| Ferenc Zsalek
|
|
|
|align=left|
|align=left|
|- align=center
|Win
|align=center|5–0||align=left| Aleksandrs Dunecs
|
|
|
|align=left|
|align=left|
|- align=center
|Win
|align=center|4–0||align=left| Vaclav Fiala
|
|
|
|align=left|
|align=left|
|- align=center
|Win
|align=center|3–0||align=left| Henadzi Daniliuk
|
|
|
|align=left|
|align=left|
|- align=center
|Win
|align=center|2–0||align=left| David Liska
|
|
|
|align=left|
|align=left|
|- align=center
|Win
|align=center|1–0||align=left| Manuel Reuss	
|
|
|
|align=left|
|align=left|
|- align=center

References

External links
 

1978 births
Living people
People from Kościerzyna
Sportspeople from Pomeranian Voivodeship
Polish male boxers
Heavyweight boxers